What on Earth? is an American television program broadcast on Science Channel. It examines strange satellite imagery and speculates on what caused the strange phenomenon. The program debuted in February 2015. It was Science Channel's most watched program, and was renewed for a third season in November 2016. It returned for a fourth season in October 2017.

On December 20, 2019, it was announced that the sixth season will premiere on January 9, 2020.

The series features Karen Bellinger, Brittany Brand, Mike Capps, Andrew Gough, Steven Kearney, Alan Lester, Jim Marrs, Rob Nelson, Nick Pope, and many other authorities.

References

External links

2015 American television series debuts
Science Channel original programming